Morpheus is the name of the programme that will deliver the next generation tactical communications system to the British Armed Forces.

In 2016, the MoD publicised plans to replace the existing Bowman  with a system named Morpheus.
Morpheus will deliver the next generation of Tactical Communication and Information Systems (TacCIS) capability. It will address critical system obsolescence and introduce a more agile TacCIS solution (both technical and business).

Procurement history
The procurement of Morpheus is being led by the Battlefield And Tactical Communications and Information Systems (BATCIS) delivery team, part of Information Systems & Services at MoD Abbey Wood.

In November 2014 an acquisition strategy paper was released which described a two-part assessment phase to examine the feasibility of the principal approaches of "Sustain", "Evolve", or "Replace" the Bowman system.

A "Systems House" branded Neo was appointed following a competition, comprising a consortium of PA Consulting, QinetiQ, Roke Manor and CGI. Its role was to generate high level technical architectures and business constructs against the MORPHEUS requirement and to provide corresponding performance, cost, time and risk data, with requirement impact assessment, to enable the Authority to assess Acquisition Options and identify requirement trades.

In September 2015, it was announced that the "Replace" option was not viable and that the chosen approach was to evolve from Bowman through the appointment of a transition partner and other suppliers, to deliver an open agile system, which would be known as Evolve to Open (EvO). The £330m contract for EvO was awarded to General Dynamics UK in April 2017.

Phase 2 of the programme is entitled Evolutionary Capability Delivery (ECD).

As of April 2022 it appears the project has hit trouble and is unclear how it may be progressing

System overview
Morpheus EvO will be based on Bowman version 5.6, and will evolve to be an open, modular system. It will connect deployed forces to their commanders, give improved access to operational IT systems and simplify the user experience. An open systems approach will allow new technologies such as radios and apps to be rapidly integrated to tackle emerging threats and enhance interoperability with allies.

The element of Morpheus that handles communications for the infantry soldier is known as Dismounted Situational Awareness (DSA), and is a successor to the long-running Future Integrated Soldier Technology programme.

References

External links 
MoD Morpheus homepage

British military radio
United Kingdom defence procurement